Allen Neal Jones (born June 2, 1977), better known by his ring name AJ Styles (also stylized as A.J. Styles), is an American professional wrestler. He is currently signed to WWE, where he performs on the Raw brand and is the leader of The O.C. stable; he is currently inactive due to injury.  Styles is widely regarded as one of the greatest professional wrestlers in history. 

Jones debuted in 1998 and competed for various independent promotions before gaining initial mainstream exposure in World Championship Wrestling (WCW) in 2001. He gained prominence after signing with Total Nonstop Action Wrestling (TNA, now Impact Wrestling), having been described as "the cornerstone of the company since [its] inception"; he won the TNA World Heavyweight Championship twice, the NWA World Heavyweight Championship three times, and was the inaugural titleholder of the X Division Championship, which he won six times. He is also the first TNA Triple Crown and Grand Slam champion. Jones simultaneously appeared in Ring of Honor (ROH) from 2002 to 2006, where he became the inaugural ROH Pure Champion. 

Jones first appeared in the World Wrestling Federation (WWF, now WWE) in 2002, but declined a developmental contract. He returned to the company in 2016, and won the WWE Championship twice.  With his second victory in Manchester, England, Jones is recognized by WWE as the first wrestler to win the title outside North America. At 371 days, this is the eighth-longest reign in title history. He also won the United States Championship three times, the Intercontinental Championship and the Raw Tag Team Championship once each, thus becoming the second wrestler (after Kurt Angle) to become a TNA/Impact and WWE Triple Crown winner and first Grand Slam champion in both promotions. 

Jones has also wrestled extensively internationally, in promotions such as New Japan Pro Wrestling (NJPW), where he is a two-time IWGP Heavyweight Champion and the United Kingdom based Revolution Pro Wrestling (RevPro), where he is a former RPW British Heavyweight Champion. 

Jones has been thought of as a pillar of the wrestling industry for over two decades, being respected by fans and co-workers, and is considered one of the world's greatest professional wrestlers. He has headlined numerous pay-per-view events, including the respective premier events of WWE and TNA, WrestleMania and Bound for Glory. He ranked atop the annual Pro Wrestling Illustrated 500 in 2010, the first TNA wrestler to do so, was voted PWI Wrestler of the Year three times between 2016 and 2018, and Wrestler of the Decade in 2020. Jones also won 10 Wrestling Observer Newsletter awards, including Wrestler of the Year in 2015 and 2016, and was inducted in their Hall of Fame in 2017.

Early life 
Allen Neal Jones was born at Marine Corps Base Camp Lejeune in Jacksonville, North Carolina, on June 2, 1977. He grew up in poverty with an abusive, alcoholic father. The family's poverty was such that they could not afford cable television, which resulted in Jones being unable to watch professional wrestling, his childhood passion. He attended Johnson High School in Gainesville, Georgia, graduating in the class of 1996. Jones took up amateur wrestling in high school and became a two-time state wrestling champion. Jones then attended Anderson University in Anderson, South Carolina, where he was on a wrestling and physical education scholarship. He was then invited by some of his friends to try professional wrestling. He entered a professional wrestling school because his friends were doing it and to find out whether he had a natural aptitude for it. To supplement his income, he worked by mowing lawns and driving an ambulance.

Professional wrestling career

Early career (1998–2001) 
Jones was trained by Rick Michaels and debuted in 1998. In the Georgia-based National Championship Wrestling (NCW) promotion he wrestled as Mr. Olympia, a masked wrestler, losing to Michael Brooks in his first singles match. By August 1999, he had won the promotion's Television Championship.

From 1999 to 2001, he generally competed in less notable independent promotions. In December 1999, NCW merged with NWA Georgia to form NWA Wildside, and Jones was renamed A.J. Styles. He appeared sporadically even after signing with NWA-TNA, and is a former NWA Georgia Heavyweight Champion, having defeated Rick Michaels for the title on December 22, 2001, at Christmas Chaos.

World Championship Wrestling (2001) 
Atlanta-based World Championship Wrestling (WCW) had observed Styles' and Air Paris' program in NWA Wildside and offered each a contract in early 2001. Styles (renamed Air Styles) and Paris were placed in a tag team, which was named Air Raid. The team's gimmick saw both men dress in G-suits, with Air Raid also appearing on Thunder. On the March 5, 2001, episode of Nitro, they were entered into a tournament for the newly created WCW Cruiserweight Tag Team Championship but were eliminated in the first round by eventual winners Elix Skipper and Kid Romeo.

World Wrestling Federation appearances (2001–2002) 
On July 9, 2001, Styles had his first WWF tryout match against his trainer, Rick Michaels, before the taping of Raw. Styles won with a Shooting Star Press but was not offered a contract.

Styles made two more appearances for the World Wrestling Federation (WWF) in 2002: on the January 26 episode of Metal (taped on January 21), in a losing effort against The Hurricane, and a dark match before the January 27 episode of SmackDown! (taped on January 22), where he was defeated by Rico Constantino. After these matches, WWF offered Styles a developmental deal contract, which would require Styles to relocate to Cincinnati, Ohio, where the Heartland Wrestling Association (HWA) developmental territory was located. Styles ultimately declined the deal, as the move would interfere with his wife's college plans. Despite this, Styles wrestled one non-contracted match for HWA, on February 19 against Matt Stryker in a losing effort.

Various promotions (2001–2002) 

On October 26, 2001, Styles participated in All Pro Wrestling's King of the Indies tournament, defeating Jardi Frantz in his first-round match but was eliminated by Christopher Daniels in the quarter-finals the following night. On November 13, 2001, Styles debuted in Xcitement Wrestling Federation (XWF), competing in a battle royal against Billy Fives, Christopher Daniels, Juventud Guerrera, Kid Kash, Prince Iaukea, Psicosis and Quick Kick for the XWF Cruiserweight Championship, but was unsuccessful in winning the title. Later that night, Styles defeated Josh Mathews in a match taped for XWF television. The following night, Styles was defeated by Daniels, again in a match taped for the XWF television program.

Styles debuted for Australian promotion World Wrestling All-Stars (WWA) on February 24, 2002, making his pay-per-view debut at The Revolution against Christopher Daniels, Low Ki, Shark Boy, Super Nova and Tony Mamaluke in a six-way cruiserweight survival elimination match, in a losing effort. On April 10, Styles faced Jerry Lynn and Super Nova in a three-way-dance, in a losing effort. On April 12, Styles defeated Nova in a tournament semi-final match at The Eruption for the International Cruiserweight Championship. Styles progressed to the final later that night in which he defeated Jerry Lynn to win the title, which he vacated soon after.

On March 2, Styles debuted in the East Coast Wrestling Association (ECWA), entering the promotion's 6th annual Super 8 tournament. He defeated Xavier in the first round, as well as The Amazing Red in his semi-finals match, but was defeated in the final by Donovan Morgan. On June 15, Styles debuted in Game Changer Wrestling, entering the Jersey-J Cup tournament. In the first round, Styles defeated Qenaan Creed, he then progressed to the quarter-final, defeating Colt Cabana. In the semi-final, he was defeated by Reckless Youth and was eliminated from the tournament.

In October, Styles traveled to the UK, debuting in the Frontier Wrestling Alliance (FWA) on October 13, suffering a loss to Jonny Storm in his debut match at FWA: British Uprising. On October 15, Styles was defeated in an FWA British Heavyweight Championship number one contender round-robin challenge three-way match by Doug Williams and Jerry Lynn at FWA: Seasons Beatings. Later that night, Styles defeated Jody Fleisch in the same round-robin challenge. On November 1, Styles debuted in IWA: Mid-South, taking part in the promotions annual Ted Petty Invitational tournament, but was defeated by Christopher Daniels in the first round.

Ring of Honor (2002–2006)

Early years (2002–2004) 

Styles debuted in Ring of Honor (ROH) at its third show, 2002's A Night of Appreciation, and quickly became a main eventer (e.g., performing in main event matches against Low Ki for the ROH World Championship at Honor Invades Boston). After failing to win the title, he became the first holder of the Number One Contender's Trophy, which was viewed within the promotion as a secondary championship at the time. At the First Anniversary Show in February 2003, Styles competed against Low Ki and Paul London in a three-way match, which was won by London. After this, Styles competed by himself and defeated The Backseat Boyz (Johnny Kashmere and Trent Acid), The Carnage Crew (HC Loc and Tony DeVito), and The S.A.T. (Joel and Jose Maximo), to receive a title shot for the ROH Tag Team Championship. He chose Amazing Red as his partner, and the two defeated The Prophecy (Christopher Daniels and Xavier) to win the championship. Styles then feuded with London, who was upset that he had chosen Red as his partner, wrestling to a draw at Night of the Grudges. Styles and Red then defeated The Briscoe Brothers (Jay and Mark Briscoe) on three separate occasions, but lost to The Prophecy. At Wrath of the Racket, Christopher Daniels and Dan Maff put Red out of action and Styles picked Homicide as his replacement partner. Styles and Homicide beat The Prophecy, but Styles had to vacate the title due to Red being sidelined by a legitimate injury.

After his reign as ROH Tag Team Champion, Styles took Jimmy Rave as his protégé and attempted to become the ROH World Champion, defeating Bryan Danielson at Main Event Spectacles to become the number one contender. At War of the Wire, Styles unsuccessfully challenged Samoa Joe for the title. He then defeated CM Punk, Jimmy Rave, and Matt Stryker in a one-night tournament at the Second Anniversary Show to become the first ROH Pure Wrestling Champion. Styles defeated Punk in a rematch with Ricky Steamboat as the guest referee at At Our Best for his final match for ROH in 2004, as TNA withdrew all of its contracted wrestlers from all ROH events and ROH vacated the title.

Feud with Jimmy Rave (2005–2006) 
Styles returned to Ring of Honor at the Third Anniversary Celebration: Part Two to wrestle Jimmy Rave, who accused him of stealing the Styles Clash (which he called the Rave Clash) from him, though he was unsuccessful in defeating Rave. During his feud with Rave and The Embassy, Styles formed an alliance with Generation Next, who were also feuding with The Embassy. At Glory by Honor IV, Styles defeated Rave with Mick Foley in his corner, with the stipulation that the loser could no longer use the Rave/Styles Clash in Ring of Honor. At This Means War, he defeated Generation Next leader Austin Aries, who was attacked by The Embassy following the show. At Vendetta, Styles had his final match against The Embassy when he, along with Austin Aries, Jack Evans and Matt Sydal were defeated by Abyss, Alex Shelley, Jimmy Rave, and Prince Nana in an eight-man tag match.

Following his feud with The Embassy, Styles set his sights on winning a championship. At A Night of Tribute, Styles faced Christopher Daniels and Matt Sydal in a three-way match, which Daniels won. On the first show of 2006, Styles wrestled and defeated Matt Sydal, after which the two agreed to form a tag team and challenge for the ROH Tag Team Championship, which was held by Sydal's Generation Next teammates Austin Aries and Roderick Strong. Before receiving a shot at the tag team title, Styles received a shot at the ROH World Championship when he was handpicked by Bryan Danielson, but he was unsuccessful. At the Fourth Anniversary Show, Styles and Sydal received their shot at the ROH Tag Team Championship, but were unable to defeat the champions.

After an absence, Styles returned at Death Before Dishonor IV, defeating Davey Richards. Styles returned at Time to Man Up, losing to Samoa Joe. In a pre-taped promo, Styles said he would be taking several months off from ROH following the match; however, ROH commentators continually referred to the match as his final match and even played a special tribute to him after it.

Total Nonstop Action Wrestling (2002–2014)

NWA World Heavyweight Champion (2002–2004) 
In May 2002, Styles was signed to a non-exclusive contract by Total Nonstop Action Wrestling (TNA). He appeared on the first weekly TNA pay-per-view, teaming with Low Ki and Jerry Lynn and losing to The Flying Elvises (Jimmy Yang, Jorge Estrada and Sonny Siaki). The following week, Styles defeated Low Ki, Jerry Lynn and Psicosis in a double elimination match to become the inaugural TNA X Division Champion. He won a second title on the third TNA pay-per-view, teaming with Lynn and defeating Bruce and Lenny Lane in the finals of a tournament for the vacant NWA World Tag Team Championship. Styles successfully defended both titles in the following weeks but began to bicker with the veteran Lynn during their matches together. On August 7, Styles lost the X Division title to Low Ki in a three-way dance also involving Lynn. The following week, he and Lynn fought Jeff Jarrett and Ron Killings to a no contest, and the tag team title was held-up as a result. The following week, he and Lynn fought one another in a Falls Count Anywhere match (which was won by Lynn), a no disqualification match (which was won by Styles) and a ten-minute Iron Man match, which ended in a draw after both men scored three pinfalls. On August 28, Low Ki defended the X Division Championship against Lynn and Styles in a ladder match and lost the title to Lynn. Recruiting Mortimer Plumtree and Sonny Siaki as allies, Styles continued to feud with Lynn in successive weeks. On October 23, he defeated Syxx-Pac for the X Division Championship, but lost the title to Lynn on November 6 and tried unsuccessfully to regain it throughout the remainder of the year.

In 2003, Styles began focusing on the NWA World Heavyweight Championship when, after defeating David Flair on January 15 to become the number one contender, he recruited the help of Larry Zbyszko and associated himself with Vince Russo's Sports Entertainment Xtreme (S.E.X.) stable. Styles faced NWA World Heavyweight Champion Jeff Jarrett on February 19, but was defeated. In the course of the match, Styles became a fan favorite, attacking S.E.X. as they tried to interfere on his behalf because he did not want to win in that manner. Styles briefly teamed with D'Lo Brown, but disbanded for their world title aspirations, challenging each other on June 4 in a number one contenders match which was won by Styles. Styles defeated Jarrett and Raven in a three-way match for the NWA World Heavyweight Championship (becoming the first TNA Triple Crown winner in the process) on June 11 with assistance from Russo, thus turning heel in the process. Throughout July 2003, Styles successfully defended the title in matches against D'Lo Brown and a myriad selection of opponents before dropping the title back to Jarrett on October 22. Following his loss, Styles reverted to being a fan favorite while Jarrett became a villain. On November 12, he teamed with Sting to defeat Lex Luger and Jeff Jarrett, though his bid for the title on December 3 was unsuccessful due to interference from Kid Kash.

Styles feuded with Abyss and Jeff Jarrett throughout January, and on February 4, 2004, after Styles demanded a title shot, Jarrett's ally Don Callis forced him to team with Abyss in a match with the NWA World Tag Team Champions, Kevin Northcutt and Legend, which Styles' won, despite being abandoned by Abyss. The following week, Styles defeated Abyss in a match to determine the sole owner of the tag team championship by disqualification after Jarrett interfered, but his victory was overturned by Callis, leading to another match the following week which was won by Abyss after Lex Luger interfered, thus granting Abyss sole control of the tag team championship. On March 17, Abyss defeated Styles to become the number one contender to the NWA World Heavyweight Championship. Russo granted Styles a championship steel cage match against Jarret on April 21, where he won his second world title. He successfully defended the title in matches with Ron Killings, Raven and Chris Harris, and on May 19 he defended against all three men in a four-way title match. Styles lost the title to Killings after Jarrett interfered in the match, hitting him with a guitar.

X Division Champion (2004–2007) 

Styles returned to the X Division shortly thereafter, winning a four-way match to become the number one contender to the X Division Championship on the June 4 episode of Impact!. On June 9, he defeated Frankie Kazarian to become a three-time X Division Champion. In the following weeks, Styles feuded with Kid Kash and Dallas, while successfully defending the title in matches with Kazarian and Mr. Águila. An additional match on June 23 with the debuting Jeff Hardy was interrupted by Kash and Dallas. On July 28, he defended the title against Kazarian and Michael Shane in an Ultimate X match. After Kash struck Styles with a crutch, Shane and Kazarian simultaneously retrieved the title belt and became co-X Division Champions. After several abortive attempts to regain the title, Styles fought Kash in a number of matches, culminating on September 8 in a tables match which was won by Styles. In October, Styles began feuding with Petey Williams (who by then was the TNA X Division Champion) and on November 7 at Victory Road, the first monthly pay-per-view event held by TNA, Styles failed to regain the title from Williams.

At Final Resolution, Styles won the X Division Championship for a fourth time in an Ultimate X match, defeating Chris Sabin and the reigning champion Petey Williams. Styles faced Christopher Daniels for the first time on January 21, 2005, and after failing to defeat him in ten minutes, qualified for a thirty-minute Iron Man match for the championship at Against All Odds, where Styles defeated Daniels to retain the title after initial tying and going into "sudden death" rules. The feud between Styles and Daniels continued and at Destination X on March 13, Styles lost the title to him in an Ultimate X Challenge also featuring Ron Killings and Elix Skipper.

After defeating Abyss at Lockdown to become the number one contender to the NWA World Heavyweight Championship, Styles won his third world championship from Jeff Jarrett at Hard Justice, which he lost to Raven in a King of the Mountain match at Slammiversary. Styles then entered the TNA 2005 Super X Cup Tournament, which granted the winner a shot at the X Division Championship. Styles defeated Matt Bentley in the quarter-finals and Petey Williams in the semi-finals, but lost to Samoa Joe at Sacrifice. As Christopher Daniels (the reigning X Division champion) had interfered in the match, TNA Director of Authority Larry Zbyszko added Styles to the resultant title bout. At Unbreakable, Styles defeated Samoa Joe and Daniels in a critically lauded three-way match to become the X Division Champion for a fifth time.

At Bound for Glory, Styles successfully defended the title against Christopher Daniels in the second thirty-minute Iron Man. The following month at Genesis, Styles successfully defended the title against Petey Williams. Styles then started a feud with Joe, claiming that he had broken the unwritten "code of the X Division" by brutally beating Daniels. At Turning Point, Styles lost the X Division Championship to Joe. Styles was unsuccessful in retaining the title in a triple threat match, also featuring Daniels, at Against All Odds, and in an Ultimate X match at Destination X, which Daniels won. After Daniels lost the title back to Joe, Styles joined Daniels to challenge America's Most Wanted for the NWA World Tag Team Championship. After losing to America's Most Wanted in title matches on two occasions, Styles and Daniels won the NWA World Tag Team Championship at Slammiversary. They successfully retained against The Latin American Xchange (Homicide and Hernandez) (LAX) at Hard Justice, only to lose the title to them in a Border Brawl on the August 24 episode of Impact!. They regained the title at No Surrender, but dropped them back to LAX at Bound for Glory in a Six Sides of Steel match.

On the November 2 episode of Impact!, Styles pinned Chris Sabin to begin his sixth reign as the new X Division Champion. The match was also the quarter-finals of the Fight for the Right tournament for number one contendership to Sting's NWA World Heavyweight Championship; Styles won the semi-final match on the November 9 Impact! but was pinned in the finals by Abyss. On the November 16 episode of Impact!, Styles lost the X Division Championship to Daniels in a three-way match when Daniels scored the roll-up pinfall on Sabin. At Genesis, Styles lost to Christian Cage, which Styles blamed on Daniels, who had tried to intervene on his behalf.

Styles next feuded with Rhino for attempting to reconcile him with Daniels and at Turning Point he beat Rhino, and on the December 22 episode of Impact!, Styles and Samoa Joe defeated Rhino and Kurt Angle. Rhino then defeated Styles in a Last Man Standing match at Final Resolution and at Destination X in an Elevation X match.

Various alliances (2007–2009) 

Styles aligned with Christian Cage for Lockdown, forming Team Cage (later Christian's Coalition), who were defeated by Team Angle at Lockdown. Styles teamed with Tomko to face Sting and Abyss at Victory Road, but were defeated. At No Surrender, Styles and Tomko won a ten-tag team gauntlet match to earn a tag team title match at Bound for Glory against Team Pacman (Adam Jones and Ron Killings), where they defeated them to win the TNA World Tag Team Championship. They successfully defended against LAX on the November 1 episode of Impact! and at Genesis against The Steiner Brothers (Rick and Scott Steiner). Later that night, Styles and Tomko inadvertently cost Cage his match and helped Kurt Angle retain the world championship. Over the next few weeks, Styles struggled to choose between aligning Cage and Angle, until he joined The Angle Alliance at Final Resolution.

In February 2008, Styles was involved in a storyline in which he became accidentally married to Karen Angle. Meanwhile, Styles and Tomko lost the TNA World Tag Team Championship to Kaz and Super Eric. With Kurt constantly accusing Styles and Karen of an affair and both denying anything beyond friendship, Styles quit The Angle Alliance. In retaliation, Tomko cost Styles his King of the Mountain qualifying match against Booker T. At Slammiversary, Styles defeated Angle after a distraction by Karen, but was beat-down by Angle and Tomko after the match. The feud continued through Hard Justice, where he defeated Angle in a Last Man Standing match. They continued trading wins and on the following episode of Impact! he defeated Angle for his Olympic gold medal. Styles also won the ladder rematch the following week to end their feud, but he was later asked to give Angle back his gold medal by Jeff Jarrett in an effort to try to mend things with Angle.

At Bound for Glory IV, Styles faced Christian Cage and Booker T in a three-way match in which Booker T won. Shortly after that, Booker T, Kurt Angle, Kevin Nash and Sting formed The Main Event Mafia, and Styles teamed up with Samoa Joe to fight them. On the October 30 episode of Impact!, Styles and Joe formed a faction of younger wrestlers known as The TNA Front Line to combat The Main Event Mafia, who recruited Scott Steiner. Styles challenged Sting for the TNA World Heavyweight Championship at Turning Point and again in an eight-man tag team match at Final Resolution, but was unsuccessful each time. On the January 22, 2009, episode of Impact!, Angle vowed to end Styles' career and later that night beat Styles in a tables match, where Styles was injured (kayfabe).

At Against All Odds, Styles returned by attacking Booker T and stealing his TNA Legends Championship. Styles defeated Booker T to become Legends Champion (and the first TNA Grand Slam Champion) at Destination X, and he retained in a rematch at Sacrifice. At Slammiversary, Styles competed in the King of the Mountain match for the TNA World Heavyweight Championship, but was unsuccessful after Samoa Joe turned on The Front Line and helped Angle win. Nash won Styles' Legends Championship at Victory Road. Following the loss, Styles began a "Best of Three Series" against Matt Morgan for entry into the TNA World Heavyweight Championship match with Sting and Angle at Hard Justice, which saw Styles winning the first match, but losing the following two, resulting in Morgan advancing to Hard Justice.

TNA World Heavyweight Champion (2009–2010) 
On the August 20 episode of Impact!, Styles was talked out of retiring by Sting, who said he had chosen Styles to carry the torch after him. At No Surrender, Styles won the TNA World Heavyweight Championship in a five-way match against Matt Morgan, Sting, Hernandez and defending champion Kurt Angle. At Bound for Glory, Styles retained the title against Sting, ending his undefeated streak at Bound for Glory in the process. Styles was mysteriously attacked by an anonymous assailant backstage leading him to believe it was Samoa Joe or Christopher Daniels, both of whom he faced the following month at Turning Point to retain the TNA World Heavyweight Championship. Styles continued to successfully defend the title against Desmond Wolfe on the December 10 episode of Impact!, against Daniels at Final Resolution, against Angle on the January 4, 2010, episode of Impact! and against Tomko, who had been revealed as his mystery attacker, on the January 14 episode of Impact!.

At Genesis, Styles turned into a villain and defeated Angle in a Last Chance match to again retain the championship with assistance from Ric Flair. On the January 21 episode of Impact!, Flair announced that he had aligned himself with Styles and christened Styles "The New Nature Boy", but on the same episode Hulk Hogan announced a Genesis rematch, where if Flair were to interfere, Styles would be stripped of the title and awarded to Angle. During the match, Angle applied his signature move, the ankle lock, on Styles, who reversed it and applied the same move to Angle, when suddenly referee Earl Hebner, paid off by Flair, called for the bell although Angle did not submit. At Against All Odds, Styles retained the title against Samoa Joe, with help from Flair, in a match refereed by Eric Bischoff. On the March 8 episode of Impact!, Styles teamed up with Ric Flair in a tag team match, in a losing effort against Abyss and Hulk Hogan. Styles defended the title against Abyss at Destination X in a match that went to no contest after Abyss hit Styles with a chokeslam through the ring. At Lockdown, Styles successfully defended the title against D'Angelo Dinero in a steel cage match. The following day on Impact!, Styles dropped the TNA World Heavyweight Championship to Rob Van Dam, ending his reign at a then-record 211 days. Styles faced Van Dam in a rematch at Sacrifice, but was defeated again.

Fortune (2010–2012) 
 

With these shortcomings, Flair adopted Kazarian as his newest protégé, thus causing Styles to become jealous and tried to impress his mentor, but after failing to defeat Jay Lethal, Flair ordered him to "go home". At Slammiversary VIII, Styles attempted to win Flair back by defeating Lethal, but lost again. On the following episode of Impact!, Flair, who had aligned himself with Styles, Desmond Wolfe, Kazarian, Robert Roode and James Storm, announced that he would reform the Four Horsemen under the new name , stating that each of them would have to earn their spots in the group. Styles and Kazarian earned their spots by defeating Samoa Joe and Rob Terry due to outside interference from Desmond Wolfe. On the July 22 episode of Impact!, Styles defeated Terry to win the Global Championship (formerly the Legends Championship) for the second time. The following week on Impact!, Styles renamed the title the TNA Television Championship.  (soon renamed Fortune) then feuded with EV 2.0 and Styles defeated EV 2.0 leader Tommy Dreamer in a non-title "I Quit" match at No Surrender, although Fortune were defeated in a Lethal Lockdown match by EV 2.0 at Bound for Glory. On the following episode of Impact!, Fortune formed an alliance with Hulk Hogan and Eric Bischoff's new stable, Immortal. At Turning Point, Fortune defeated EV 2.0 in a ten-man tag team match and, as a result, EV 2.0's Sabu was released from TNA. The following month at Final Resolution, Styles lost the Television Championship to Douglas Williams, who had turned on Fortune. On the February 3 episode of Impact!, Fortune turned into fan favorites by attacking Immortal, when they interfered in a TNA World Heavyweight Championship match between Mr. Anderson and Jeff Hardy. Flair, who did not take part in Fortune's turn due to an injury, returned on the February 17 episode of Impact!, turning on Fortune during a match between Styles and Matt Hardy and jumping to Immortal. Styles faced Flair and Hardy in a three-way street fight match on March 10, where Styles was pinned by his former mentor, with assistance from Hardy. At Victory Road, Styles defeated Hardy in a singles match, despite interference from Flair.

On the following episode of Impact!, Styles was sidelined with a storyline injury after Flair helped Bully Ray perform a powerbomb on him off the entrance stage through a table. Styles made his return on April 17 at Lockdown, attacking Bully Ray and helping Fortune defeat Immortal. He then feuded with Tommy Dreamer, who joined Immortal to save his job; Ray cost Styles his match against Dreamer at Sacrifice by hitting him with a chain. On the May 26 episode of the newly rebranded Impact Wrestling, Styles and Daniels defeated Ray and Dreamer in a no disqualification street fight match, with Styles pinning Dreamer to avenge his loss at Sacrifice. The feud ended at Slammiversary IX, where Ray defeated Styles in a Last Man Standing match. Styles then defeated fellow Fortune member Christopher Daniels in the main event of Destination X. After weeks of asking for a rematch, Styles finally granted Daniels one on the September 1 episode of Impact Wrestling, where Daniels won and refused to shake hands with Styles. At Bound for Glory, Styles defeated Daniels in an "I Quit" match. After defeating Daniels again on the November 10 episode of Impact Wrestling, Styles entered into a feud with TNA World Heavyweight Champion Bobby Roode, failing to capture the championship at Turning Point, tying him in an Iron-Man Match at Final Resolution, but losing the sudden-death tie-breaker on the following Impact Wrestling. During the following episodes of Impact Wrestling, Styles and Kazarian, the last two members of Fortune, made it to the finals of the Wild Card Tournament. During the final match against Magnus and Samoa Joe on the January 5, 2012, episode of Impact Wrestling, Kazarian abandoned Styles and aligned himself with Christopher Daniels, effectively ending Fortune.

Final storylines (2012–2014) 
On the February 9 episode of Impact Wrestling, Kazarian, now seemingly a reluctant associate of Daniels, helped him defeat Styles in a singles match. Three days later at Against All Odds, Styles was defeated by Kazarian in a singles match. On the March 3 episode of Impact Wrestling, Kazarian defeated Styles in a gauntlet match; had Styles been successful, Kazarian would have to explain his alliance with Daniels. Mr. Anderson then returned and aligned with Styles to defeat Daniels and Kazarian in tag team match at Victory Road and at Lockdown, where the two duos were on opposing teams in the annual Lethal Lockdown match. On the May 10 episode of Impact Wrestling, Kazarian revealed that he originally aligned himself with Daniels to keep him from revealing Styles' secret, but changed his mind after learning what the secret was, at which point Daniels revealed a series of photographs insinuating a relationship between Styles and TNA president Dixie Carter.

At Sacrifice, Daniels and Kazarian cost Styles his match against Kurt Angle, who nonetheless saved Styles from a post-match beatdown. On May 31, Styles defeated Daniels in the main event of the first live episode of Impact Wrestling, after which Daniels and Kazarian played audio of a phone conversation to prove an affair between Styles and Carter. At Slammiversary, Styles and Angle defeated Daniels and Kazarian to win their TNA World Tag Team Championship. On the following episode of Impact Wrestling, Styles entered the 2012 Bound for Glory Series, where he was eliminated in the opening gauntlet match by Daniels. On the June 21 episode of Impact Wrestling, Styles and Carter revealed their secret—they were not having an affair but were helping an addicted pregnant woman named Claire Lynch overcome her problems. The following week on Impact Wrestling, Styles and Angle lost the TNA World Tag Team Championship back to Daniels and Kazarian when Kazarian hit Styles with a steel chair, after which Daniels admitted that Styles and Carter had told the truth about Claire, but claimed that they had left out the part about Styles being the father of her unborn baby. Styles defeated Daniels in a Last Man Standing match at Destination X, and again in a Bound for Glory Series match and, per the pre-match stipulations, earned the right to get a paternity test on Claire's baby. The following week on Impact Wrestling it was revealed that Claire was not pregnant after all and her attorney revealed Daniels' and Kazarian's plot to blackmail Styles. On the August 30 episode of Impact Wrestling, Styles was eliminated in the 2012 Bound for Glory Series after losing to Samoa Joe. At No Surrender and Bound for Glory, Styles and Angle unsuccessfully challenged Daniels and Kazarian for the TNA World Tag Team Championship. Styles was pinned by James Storm in a three-way number one contender's match for the TNA World Heavyweight Championship at Turning Point, also involving Bobby Roode, preventing him from receiving another title opportunity until Bound for Glory 2013 as per the pre-match stipulation. On December 9 at Final Resolution, Styles was defeated by Christopher Daniels in what was billed as their "final match". On the following episode of Impact Wrestling, Styles said that he was tired of doing the right thing and that he was going to do his own thing from there on.

Beginning in February 2013, TNA began airing videos at Styles' home interviewing his wife, a friend, and even attempting to interview Styles himself before he angrily forced them to leave. Styles, now sporting a beard, unkempt hair, and all-black attire, returned to TNA with the Calf Killer submission hold as his new finisher, which he used to defeat James Storm in his first match back. Styles, who remained silent in the following weeks, began feuding with Kurt Angle after refusing to tell Angle whether or not he was with the Aces & Eights stable. His new gimmick was nicknamed "The Lone Wolf", since he rejected to join Aces & Eights. At Slammiversary XI, Styles was defeated by Angle in a singles match, but he defeated him in a rematch to earn the final spot in the 2013 Bound for Glory Series. Throughout the following weeks, Styles participated in the Bound For Glory Series, winning the tournament and becoming the number one contender for the TNA World Heavyweight Championship at Bound for Glory. The following week on Impact Wrestling, Styles claimed that he was no longer under contract with TNA and insulted Dixie Carter, who responded by saying that Styles was not a great wrestler. In the weeks leading up to Bound for Glory, Styles continued to appear on Impact Wrestling, despite not having a contract with the company, but he would defeat Bully Ray at Bound for Glory, despite interference from Aces & Eights and Carter, to win his second TNA World Heavyweight Championship and fifth world title in the company overall. Styles made his first televised title defense on the following episode of Impact Wrestling, defeating Ray in a rematch after interference from Mr. Anderson, after which he refused Carter's new contract offer and walked out of TNA with the title. On October 29, TNA vacated the TNA World Heavyweight Championship. On the December 2 taping of Impact Wrestling which aired on January 2, 2014, Styles returned to TNA with his championship to confront Carter and Magnus (who had won a tournament to crown the new TNA World Heavyweight Champion), with Styles challenging Magnus to a title unification match on next weeks episode of Impact Wrestling, which Magnus accepted. On December 5 taping of Impact Wrestling which aired on tape delay on January 9, Magnus won to unify both titles after interference from eight other wrestlers on Magnus' behalf and Sting interfering on Styles' behalf in what would be Styles' final match with TNA. On December 8, it was reported that contract negotiations between Styles and TNA had broken down and that Styles would be leaving the promotion, becoming a free agent effective December 17 and ending his near twelve-year association with the company. According to Styles he left the promotion since they made him an offer which reduced his salary about 60%.

Mexican and Japanese partnerships (2006–2013) 
During his stay in TNA, Styles worked in various Japanese and Mexican promotions due to a partnership with TNA.

On September 17, 2006, at Verano de Escándalo, Styles made his debut for Mexican promotion AAA, as part of a cross promotion deal between TNA and AAA. Team TNA (Styles, Homicide, Low Ki, and Samoa Joe) defeated Vipers Revolution (Abismo Negro, Charly Manson, Electroshock and Histeria) in a semi-final tournament match then later defeated The Mexican Powers (Crazy Boy, Joe Líder and Juventud Guerrera) in the finals.

On December 20, 2007, as part of TNA's working relationship with the Inoki Genome Federation (IGF), Styles competed in the promotion's third event, defeating fellow TNA star Senshi.

During a partnership between TNA and New Japan Pro Wrestling (NJPW), Styles made four appearances for NJPW in 2008, starting on January 4 at Wrestle Kingdom II, where Styles teamed with Christian Cage and Petey Williams to defeat RISE (Milano Collection AT, Minoru and Prince Devitt) in a six-man tag team match. On February 17, Styles lost to Hiroshi Tanahashi on Day 8 of New Japan's ISM Tour. On August 15, Styles teamed with Shinjiro Otani to face Kurt Angle and Masahiro Chono on Day 5 of New Japan's G1 Climax – Heroes of Supremacy event, in a losing effort. The following day on Day 6 of New Japan's G1 Climax – Heroes of Supremacy show, Styles teamed with Tanahashi to face the team of Kurt Angle and Shinsuke Nakamura, again in a losing effort.

On July 26, 2008, Styles made his debut for Consejo Mundial de Lucha Libre (CMLL), taking part in the promotion's last annual 16-man elimination International Gran Prix tournament, representing Team International. Styles would defeat Rey Bucanero of Team Mexico in his first match, but would later be eliminated from the tournament by Último Guerrero. Guerrero went on to lose to Team International member Alex Shelley later in the night, with Shelley winning the tournament for Team International.

Styles returned to AAA on December 16, 2011, at Guerra de Titanes, as part of the TNA invasion storyline. He faced El Mesías in a match to earn a shot at the AAA World Heavyweight Championship, but was unsuccessful. On November 3, 2013, Styles would once again return to AAA, this time to successfully defend the TNA World Heavyweight Championship (which had been vacated by TNA just days before) in a rematch against El Mesías.

On November 16, 2013, Styles made his debut for Japanese promotion Wrestle-1, successfully defending the TNA World Heavyweight Championship against Seiya Sanada.

Return to Impact Wrestling (2022)
At Slammiversary, on June 19, 2022, Styles returned to Impact Wrestling for one night only, in a video message to congratulate Impact on their 20 years.

Return to the independent circuit (2003–2005) 

On March 14, Styles returned to International Wrestling Cartel (IWC) and successfully challenged IWC Super Indy Champion Super Hentai for the title. On April 13, Styles defended the title in a rematch against Hentai, but the match ended in a no contest, meaning Styles retained the title. On May 10, Styles vacated the title. On August 23, Styles unsuccessfully challenged the new Super Indy Champion Colt Cabana after the match ended at a twenty-minute time limit draw, meaning Cabana retained the title. On December 12 at IWC: Call to Arms, Styles would once again challenge Cabana for the title, but again was unsuccessful. On April 12, Styles debuted in Combat Zone Wrestling (CZW), competing at the promotions 3rd Best of the Best event. Styles teamed with Jason Cross to face Jay Briscoe and Jimmy Rave, in a losing effort. On July 20, at CZW: Deja Vu II, Styles successfully defended the NWA World Heavyweight Championship against Rave.

On September 12, Styles debuted in Maximum Pro Wrestling (MXPW), successfully challenging MXPW Television Champion Chris Sabin and Christopher Daniels in a three-way match for the title. On October 4, Styles debuted in Pro Wrestling Guerrilla (PWG), unsuccessfully challenging PWG Champion Frankie Kazarian and Christopher Daniels for the title. On November 7, Styles returned to IWA: Mid-South to take part in the promotions annual Ted Petty Invitational, which saw Styles defeating Todd Sexton is his first-round match. The following night, he defeated Jerry Lynn in the quarter-finals, but later that night would be eliminated by Danny Daniels in the semi-finals. On March 20, 2004, Styles returned to IWC, entering the promotions Super Indy Survivor Showdown tournament. Styles' first match in the tournament was in the semi-finals due to unknown reasons, in which he defeated CM Punk. Later that night, Styles faced IWC Super Indy Champion Colt Cabana in the final in a winning effort, capturing the title. On April 17, Styles successfully defended the title against Homicide, and on May 8 he did so again against Christopher Daniels.

On September 17, Styles returned to IWA: Mid-South, entering the promotions 2004 Ted Petty Invitational. Styles defeated Jimmy Rave in his first-round match. The following night, Styles defeated Matt Sydal in the quarter-finals. Later that night, Styles defeated Arik Cannon in the semi-finals, as well as defeating Bryan Danielson and Samoa Joe in the final to win the 2004 Ted Petty Invitational. On October 21, Styles won the vacant IWA: Mid-South Heavyweight Championship, defeating Chris Sabin, Christopher Daniels, and Petey Williams in a four-way dance match. Two days later on October 23, Styles lost the title to CM Punk.

On April 1, 2005, Styles returned to PWG, defeating Samoa Joe in a PWG Championship number one contender match at the promotion's All-Star Weekend – Day 1. The following night on Day 2 of All-Star Weekend, Styles successfully challenged Super Dragon for the title. Styles defended the title until August 6 at Zombies Shouldn't Run, where he lost it to Kevin Steen. On September 3, Styles entered the 2005 Battle of Los Angeles tournament but was defeated in the finals by Chris Bosh.

Return to ROH (2014–2016) 
Styles defeated Roderick Strong in his return match on the January 4, 2014, taping of Ring of Honor Wrestling, and picked up victories over Jay Lethal at the 12th Anniversary Show and Chris Hero at the Flyin' High event. At All Star Extravaganza VII, he became the number one contender for the ROH World Championship by winning a four-way match involving Adam Cole, Michael Elgin and Roderick Strong, but he unsuccessfully challenged champion Jay Lethal at Final Battle.

Styles made his final independent appearance before he began working for WWE at ROH's TV tapings in Duluth, Georgia on January 23, 2016. At the tapings, Styles was interrupted by Jay Lethal and The House of Truth, followed by Roderick Strong. An ensuing brawl saw Styles' former Bullet Club stablemates Doc Gallows, Karl Anderson, and The Young Bucks (who had fired Styles from the stable just over two weeks prior) assist him against various members of the ROH roster. At the end of the show, Styles proceeded to join Bullet Club in a group hug, mirroring the famous 1996 WWF Madison Square Garden "Curtain Call".

Second return to the independent circuit (2014–2016) 

Following his departure from TNA, Styles would begin taking independent bookings for the first time in two years, accepting as many dates as possible and more regularly. During his second run on the independent circuit, he competed in various countries around the world, most notably England.

On March 1, 2014, Styles made an appearance for English promotion Preston City Wrestling, losing to British wrestler Lionheart in the main event. Following the match, Styles gave Lionheart the Styles Clash, during which Lionheart improperly tucked his chin, resulting in him landing on top of his head and legitimately breaking his neck.

On February 8, Styles returned to Combat Zone Wrestling (CZW) after eleven years, defeating CZW World Heavyweight Champion Drew Gulak via disqualification, which meant that Gulak retained the title. In August, Styles also returned to Pro Wrestling Guerrilla (PWG) after eleven years, taking part in the promotion's annual 10th Battle of Los Angeles tournament, where on August 29 he defeated Brian Myers to make it to the quarterfinals before losing to Roderick Strong via disqualification on August 31.

On March 11, 2015, Styles defeated John Hennigan to win the FWE Heavyweight Championship in a best of three falls match two falls to one; Hennigan won the first fall after hitting the  Starship Pain, but Styles made Hennigan tap out to the  Calf Killer shortly thereafter to score fall number two and pinned Hennigan following a Styles Clash to win the title.

On May 29, 2015, reigning IWGP Heavyweight Champion Styles (representing Bullet Club with manager Jonny Ferrari) defeated Justin Gabriel at House of Glory High Intensity 4 in Jamaica, New York.

On June 14, Styles won the Revolution Pro Wrestling (RPW) British Heavyweight Championship, defeating Marty Scurll at Summer Sizzler for the title.

In September, Styles made his debut for Chikara, when he teamed with fellow Bullet Club members The Young Bucks (Matt and Nick Jackson) in the 2015 King of Trios. They made it to the semi-finals of the three-day-long tournament, defeating Team Fight Club (Trent Seven, Tyler Bate and Dan Moloney), but were ultimately defeated in the finals by Team AAA (Aero Star, Drago and Fénix).

On January 14, 2016, Styles wrestled a match for 5 Star Wrestling in Sheffield, England, where he faced Rey Mysterio for the first time, where Styles defeated Mysterio. Styles lost to John Morrison in a singles match which was for the inaugural 5 Star Wrestling Championship.

On January 16, Styles returned to Revolution Pro Wrestling in London, England, losing the RPW British Heavyweight Championship to Zack Sabre Jr. Following the match, Styles cut a promo addressing his future and teased entering the Royal Rumble match. On February 5, Styles wrestled his final independent match (which he had pre-booked before signing with WWE), defeating Corey Hollis at Georgia Premier Wrestling.

New Japan Pro-Wrestling (2014–2016) 

For the first time since the TNA-NJPW partnership in 2008, on March 27, 2014, it was reported that Styles would return to New Japan Pro-Wrestling and had signed a contract with the company. Styles' return came on April 6 at Invasion Attack, where he attacked IWGP Heavyweight Champion Kazuchika Okada after his match and laid him out with the Styles Clash and challenged Okada to a title match, before revealing himself as the newest member of Bullet Club, establishing himself as a villain in the process. Following Invasion Attack, with Styles still working a full schedule on the American independent circuit and only booked to work NJPW's larger events, Karl Anderson was positioned as the new leader of Bullet Club. However, Styles was considered the leader of the Ring of Honor (ROH) version of Bullet Club, a role which was also given to him by NJPW by the end of 2015. Styles wrestled his first match under a New Japan contract on May 3 at Wrestling Dontaku, where he defeated Okada with help from Yujiro Takahashi to become the new IWGP Heavyweight Champion. With this victory, Styles became the sixth gaijin (non-Japanese) champion in the title's history and the first American champion since Brock Lesnar in 2005. The win also made Styles the shortest IWGP Heavyweight Champion in history. On May 17, Styles made his first successful title defense in a three-way match with Okada and Michael Elgin at the NJPW/ROH co-produced War of the Worlds event in New York City. On May 25 at Back to the Yokohama Arena, Styles defeated Okada for his second successful title defense. Styles suffered his first loss in NJPW on July 21, when he was defeated by Okada in his first match in the 2014 G1 Climax tournament. Out of his nine remaining matches in the tournament, Styles lost only one, but failed to advance to the finals due to his loss against Okada in the head-to-head match. On October 13 at King of Pro-Wrestling, Styles lost the IWGP Heavyweight Championship to Hiroshi Tanahashi in his third defense, after the returning Yoshitatsu stopped Bullet Club's newest member, Jeff Jarrett, from interfering in the match.

On November 8 at Power Struggle, Styles defeated Yoshitatsu with help from Jarrett and after the match was confronted by Tetsuya Naito. During the match, Yoshitatsu legitimately broke his neck on a botched Styles Clash in which he tucked his head, leading to NJPW pushing Styles as a "killer" and the Styles Clash as a controversial maneuver. Later in the month, Styles entered the 2014 World Tag League, alongside Yujiro Takahashi. Despite a win over the reigning IWGP Tag Team Champions, Bullet Club stablemates Doc Gallows and Karl Anderson, Styles and Takahashi failed to advance from their block with a record of four wins and three losses due to losing to Kazuchika Okada and Yoshi-Hashi on the final day. Styles and Naito faced off in a match on January 4, 2015, at Wrestle Kingdom 9 in Tokyo Dome, where Styles was victorious. On January 6, 2015, Styles inserted himself back into the IWGP Heavyweight Championship picture, when he pinned Tanahashi in an eight-man tag team match, setting up a title match between the two at The New Beginning in Osaka. On February 11, Styles defeated Tanahashi to win the IWGP Heavyweight Championship for the second time. Styles made his first title defense on April 5 at Invasion Attack, where he defeated 2015 New Japan Cup winner Kota Ibushi. His five-month reign ended in his second defense on July 5 at Dominion 7.5 in Osaka-jo Hall, where he was defeated by Kazuchika Okada. From July 20 to August 14, Styles took part in the 2015 G1 Climax. Styles entered the final day with a chance to advance from his block, but a loss against Hiroshi Tanahashi cost him a spot in the finals, giving him a record of six wins and three losses. On October 12 at King of Pro-Wrestling, Styles received a rematch for the IWGP Heavyweight Championship, but was again defeated by Okada.

In November, Styles entered the IWGP Intercontinental Championship picture by challenging Shinsuke Nakamura to a title match. Later that month, Styles was forced to pull out of the 2015 World Tag League, where he teamed with Yujiro Takahashi, after experiencing a back injury. Styles returned to the NJPW ring on January 4, 2016, at Wrestle Kingdom 10 in Tokyo Dome, where he unsuccessfully challenged Shinsuke Nakamura for the IWGP Intercontinental Championship. Hours after Styles' Wrestle Kingdom 10 match, it was reported that Styles had given his notice to NJPW on the morning of January 4, announcing that he was leaving the promotion and signing with WWE. The following day, Styles made his final appearance for NJPW, where the rest of Bullet Club turned on him with Kenny Omega becoming the stable's new leader.

WWE (2016–present)

Championship Victories and Feud with John Cena (2016–2017) 

After weeks of speculation and WWE themselves covering the rumors of Styles leaving NJPW for WWE, on January 20, 2016, it was confirmed that he had signed with WWE. Prior to signing, Styles had also had extensive discussions with TNA and according to them, Styles had agreed to return to the promotion with Bullet Club stablemates Doc Gallows and Karl Anderson, before being offered a "blow-away deal" by WWE. After not being on WWE television since his Metal match in 2002, Styles made his re-debut in WWE on January 24 at the Royal Rumble pay-per-view during the Royal Rumble match for the WWE World Heavyweight Championship, entering at number three. Styles went on to eliminate Curtis Axel and Tyler Breeze, before being eliminated by Kevin Owens, lasting just under 29 minutes in the match. Styles then entered a storyline with Chris Jericho, with the two exchanging victories on both Raw and SmackDown, which ultimately led to an encounter between the two on February 21 at Fastlane, where Styles emerged victorious via submission. After Fastlane, Jericho and Styles formed a tag team, dubbed "Y2AJ", and went on to defeat The New Day (Big E and Kofi Kingston) in two non-title matches. This led to a match for the WWE Tag Team Championship on the March 7 episode of Raw, which Y2AJ failed to win, after which Jericho turned on Styles and attacked him, officially ending their team. The two subsequently interfered in each other's matches, leading to Styles challenging Jericho to a match at WrestleMania 32, which Jericho ultimately accepted on the March 28 episode of Raw. At WrestleMania 32 on April 3, Styles lost to Jericho.

On the following episode of Raw, Styles won a fatal four-way match to become the number one contender for Roman Reigns' WWE World Heavyweight Championship. In the weeks that followed, Styles reunited with former Bullet Club stablemates Luke Gallows and Karl Anderson (now known as The Club) and an alliance, which Styles initially denied, was teased. At Payback on May 1, Reigns eventually defeated Styles by pinfall after the match was restarted twice (with Styles first winning by countout and then by disqualification), despite Gallows and Anderson's interference. Styles received a rematch against Reigns for the championship at Extreme Rules on May 22 in an Extreme Rules match, but was unsuccessful due to interference from both Gallows and Anderson and The Usos (Jey and Jimmy Uso). The following night on Raw, Styles failed to qualify for the Money in the Bank ladder match at Money in the Bank against Kevin Owens. On the May 30 episode of Raw, he welcomed back a returning John Cena, only to attack Cena with help from Gallows and Anderson, turning heel in the process. This set up a match between Styles and Cena at Money in the Bank on June 19, which Styles won after interference from The Club. At Battleground on July 24, The Club lost to Cena and Enzo Amore and Big Cass in a six-man tag team match after Cena pinned Styles. During the 2016 WWE draft, Styles was drafted to the SmackDown brand in the first round of picks, being the brand's second pick overall, while Gallows and Anderson were drafted to the Raw brand, splitting up The Club. Styles faced Cena once more at SummerSlam on August 21, which Styles won again. After his victory over Cena, Styles claimed himself to be the "new face of WWE" and "the Face That Runs the Place".

Due to his victory at SummerSlam, Styles immediately re-entered the renamed WWE World Championship picture and received another opportunity at the title at Backlash against Dean Ambrose. At the pay-per view on September 11, Styles defeated Ambrose to become the WWE World Champion for the first time after a low blow, also his first championship in WWE and eighth world title overall. Styles made his first successful title defense against Ambrose in a rematch on the September 27 episode of SmackDown after interference from John Cena. At No Mercy on October 9, Styles retained the title against Cena and Ambrose in a triple threat match after pinning Cena. At Survivor Series on November 20, Styles made up Team SmackDown alongside Ambrose, Bray Wyatt, Randy Orton and Shane McMahon in the 5-on-5 Survivor Series match against Team Raw, which the former won. At TLC: Tables, Ladders & Chairs on December 4, Styles retained the championship over Ambrose in a Tables, Ladders, and Chairs match after James Ellsworth interfered and pushed Ambrose off a ladder and through several tables. Styles then resumed his feud with Cena leading into the 2017 Royal Rumble on January 29, where Styles was defeated for the championship, ending his reign at 140 days.

On February 12 at Elimination Chamber, Styles competed in an Elimination Chamber match against Cena, Baron Corbin, Bray Wyatt, Dean Ambrose and The Miz for the WWE Championship, which Wyatt won. On the following episode of SmackDown, Styles failed to regain the title from Wyatt in a triple threat match also involving Cena. The following month, Styles began a feud with SmackDown Commissioner Shane McMahon, due to Styles' frustration of being unable to reclaim the WWE Championship. This led to a match between the two at WrestleMania 33 on April 2, which Styles won. On the following episode of SmackDown, Styles shook hands with McMahon, thus turning face in the process.

On the April 11 episode of SmackDown, Styles defeated Baron Corbin and Sami Zayn to become the number one contender for the United States Championship. At Backlash on May 21, Styles lost his match against Kevin Owens for the United States Championship by countout. At Money in the Bank on June 18, Styles competed in the Money in the Bank ladder match, but failed to win. After Styles became once again the number one contender to Owens' championship, a title match was set for Battleground. However, two weeks before the pay-per-view, Styles defeated Owens during a WWE house show at Madison Square Garden on July 7 to capture the United States Championship for the first time in his career. However, at Battleground on July 23, Styles lost the title back to Owens, but regained it two days later on SmackDown in a triple threat match also involving a returning Chris Jericho, beginning his second reign with the championship. At SummerSlam on August 20, Styles defeated Owens to retain the title with Shane McMahon as the special guest referee. After once again defeating Owens two days later on SmackDown to end the feud. In September, Styles began a feud with Tye Dillinger and Baron Corbin, leading to a triple threat match at Hell in a Cell on October 8, where Styles lost the title to Corbin who pinned Dillinger, thus ending his reign at 75 days. Two days later on SmackDown, Styles failed to regain the title from Corbin.

Year-long WWE Championship reign (2017–2018) 

On the October 17 episode of SmackDown, Styles began a rivalry with then WWE Champion Jinder Mahal by confronting and attacking him. On October 22, Styles appeared at Raw's exclusive event TLC: Tables, Ladders & Chairs, competing against Finn Bálor due to Bálor's original opponent Bray Wyatt not being cleared to compete, where he was defeated by Bálor. On the November 7 episode of SmackDown in Manchester, England, Styles defeated Jinder Mahal to win the WWE Championship for the second time in what marked the first time the title changed hands on SmackDown since September 2003, becoming recognized by WWE as the first titleholder crowned outside of North America (Antonio Inoki had won the title in Japan in 1979, but this reign is unrecognized by WWE). With the win, Styles replaced Mahal in the champion vs. champion match at Survivor Series against Universal Champion Brock Lesnar on November 19, which he went on to lose. At Clash of Champions on December 17, Styles defeated Mahal via submission in his first title defense. Styles' next feud came against Kevin Owens and Sami Zayn, whom he lost back-to-back matches to due to interference, which led to a handicap championship match at the Royal Rumble on January 28, 2018 which Styles won. Styles then successfully defended the title against Kevin Owens, Sami Zayn, John Cena, Baron Corbin, and Dolph Ziggler in a six-pack challenge at Fastlane on March 11.

Styles then started a feud with Royal Rumble winner Shinsuke Nakamura. At WrestleMania 34 on April 8, Styles defeated Nakamura to retain the WWE Championship, and after the match, Styles was subjected to a classless assault by Nakamura, heating up their feud. Styles went on to retain his title against Nakamura on three different events: Greatest Royal Rumble on April 27 by double countout, Backlash on May 6 in a no disqualification match that ended in a no contest, and Money in the Bank on June 17, where Styles ended the feud after winning a Last Man Standing match. After a successful defense against Rusev at Extreme Rules on July 15, Styles became the longest-reigning WWE Champion in SmackDown history on August 14, surpassing the 280-day record set by John "Bradshaw" Layfield.

On the July 24 episode of SmackDown, Styles started a feud with Samoa Joe, after he was attacked by Joe. Styles retained the title at SummerSlam on August 19, despite losing via disqualification. Styles' and Joe's rivalry continued following SummerSlam over Styles' wife, Wendy, where Joe claimed he would defeat Styles and become the "new daddy", leading to a rematch at Hell in a Cell on September 16, where Styles defeated Joe in controversial fashion to retain the title; Styles submitted to Joe during a roll-up, however, the referee did not see the submission and counted the pin allowing Styles to retain the title. Styles went on to retain the title against Joe at Super Show-Down on October 6 by submission and Crown Jewel on November 2.

At Super Show-Down, Daniel Bryan become the number one contender for Styles' title, they would be scheduled to face each other for the title at Crown Jewel. However, the match took place on the October 30 episode of SmackDown Live, where Styles defeated Bryan to retain the title. On November 7, Styles surpassed the 365-day mark of his title reign, becoming the 8th man to have held the WWE Championship for a continuous reign of a full year. On the November 13 episode of SmackDown Live, Styles lost his title to Daniel Bryan following a low blow, ending his reign at 371 days. Styles received his rematch against Bryan at TLC: Tables, Ladders & Chairs on December 16, but failed to regain the championship.

Return of The Club (2019–2020) 
At Royal Rumble on January 27, 2019, Styles once again failed to win the title, after a returning Rowan attacked Styles when the referee was incapacitated and allowed Bryan to retain the title. Following the Royal Rumble, Styles gained another opportunity to earn back the championship after qualifying for the Elimination Chamber match. At Elimination Chamber on February 17, Styles was unsuccessful after he was eliminated by Randy Orton. Styles and Orton then started making disparaging comments about one another, starting a feud between the two. At Fastlane on March 10, after Orton interrupted Elias, Styles hit Orton with a Phenomenal Forearm out of nowhere. This led to a confrontation between the two on the March 12 episode of SmackDown Live, in which Styles challenged Orton to a match at WrestleMania 35. At WrestleMania on April 7, Styles defeated Orton. The next day, it was reported that Styles had had an injury during his match with Orton and was sent home to recover. Styles did not appear on the SmackDown Live following WrestleMania, and it was reported to be a hip injury.

On April 15, Styles was drafted to the Raw brand as part of Superstar Shake-up. The following week on Raw, chief executive officer Triple H scheduled two triple threat matches, with the winners facing each other to determine the next contender against Seth Rollins for the Universal Championship, where Styles defeated fellow draftees Rey Mysterio and Samoa Joe in the triple threat match and then defeated Baron Corbin to earn a Universal Championship match against Seth Rollins at Money in the Bank. Following a contract signing for the match the next week, Styles would begin a slow heel turn, doing things like becoming more aggressive in the ring, walking out on Rollins in tag team match, and criticizing Luke Gallows and Karl Anderson (who had also moved back to Raw) when they would lose a match for being overconfident. At the event on May 19, Styles failed to win the title from Rollins.

Styles returned on the June 24 episode of Raw, after a month of inactivity due to injuries suffered at Money in the Bank, defeating United States Champion Ricochet in a non-title match. On the July 1 episode of Raw, Styles failed to win the United States Championship from Ricochet. After the match, he attacked Ricochet with help from Gallows and Anderson, turning heel for the first time since April 2017. At Extreme Rules on July 14, Styles defeated Ricochet to win the United States Championship for a third time. On the July 22 episode of Raw, The club was renamed "The O.C." ("Original Club"). At SummerSlam on August 11, Styles successfully retained the title against Ricochet. Styles then retained his title against Cedric Alexander at Clash of Champions on September 15 and against Humberto Carrillo at Crown Jewel on October 31. At Survivor Series on November 24, Styles was defeated by NXT North American Champion Roderick Strong in an interbrand triple-threat match also involving Intercontinental Champion Shinsuke Nakamura. On the November 25 episode of Raw, Styles lost his title to Rey Mysterio, ending his reign at 134 days.

At the Royal Rumble on January 26, 2020, Styles entered the Royal Rumble match at eighteen, but was eliminated by Edge. At Super ShowDown on February 27, Styles was defeated last in a gauntlet match for the Tuwaiq Trophy by a returning The Undertaker. On March 8 at Elimination Chamber, Styles was defeated in a no disqualification match by Aleister Black after interference from The Undertaker. The next night on Raw, Styles challenged The Undertaker to a match at WrestleMania 36, which was confirmed the following week. On April 4, the "Part 1" pay-per-view of the two-night event, Styles headlined WrestleMania for the first time, losing to The Undertaker in a Boneyard match in the main event. After WrestleMania, Styles took a sabbatical from WWE television. On April 15, both Anderson and Gallows were released from their WWE contracts as part of budget cuts stemming from the COVID-19 pandemic, effectively disbanding The O.C.

Alliance with Omos (2020–2021) 

After a brief hiatus, Styles returned on the May 4 episode of Raw and won a gauntlet match to take a spot in the Money in the Bank ladder match at Money in the Bank. At the event on May 10, Styles was unsuccessful at capturing the briefcase. On the May 22 episode of SmackDown, Styles was traded to the brand as he was announced as a participant in the Intercontinental Championship tournament. He defeated Shinsuke Nakamura in the first round, and earned a bye to the finals after his scheduled opponent Elias was unable to compete. On the June 12 episode of SmackDown, Styles defeated Daniel Bryan to win the Intercontinental Championship for the first time. During the following weeks, Styles successfully defended the title against the likes of Drew Gulak, Matt Riddle, and Gran Metalik. On the August 21 episode of SmackDown, Styles lost the title to Jeff Hardy, ending his reign at 70 days. At Clash of Champions on September 27, Styles failed to regain the title in a triple threat ladder match that was won by Sami Zayn.

As part of the 2020 Draft in October, Styles was drafted back to the Raw brand. On the October 19 episode of Raw, Styles debuted a new bodyguard, Omos before defeating Riddle. At Survivor Series on November 22, Styles captained Team Raw to a clean sweep victory against Team SmackDown. Shortly after the event, Styles would begin a feud with WWE Champion Drew McIntyre. At TLC: Tables, Ladders & Chairs on December 20, Styles faced McIntyre for the title in a TLC match but failed to win as The Miz unsuccessfully cashed in his Money in the Bank briefcase during the match. At Superstar Spectacle on January 26, 2021, he defeated Jeet Rama. At Royal Rumble on January 31, Styles competed in the Royal Rumble match but failed to win after being eliminated by Braun Strowman. At Elimination Chamber on February 21, Styles unsuccessfully challenged for the WWE Championship inside the steel structure after being the final man eliminated by Drew McIntyre.

On the first night of WrestleMania 37 on April 10, Styles and Omos defeated The New Day to win the Raw Tag Team Championship and in the process, Styles became the twenty-second WWE Grand Slam Champion, and the first to achieve both the WWE and TNA/Impact Grand Slam. Over the following months, Styles and Omos successfully defended the titles in rematches with The New Day and against Elias and Jaxson Ryker before entering into a feud with The Viking Raiders. A match was made between Styles and Omos and The Viking Raiders for the titles at Money in the Bank. At the event on July 18, Styles and Omos successfully defended the titles against The Viking Raiders. After this, Styles and Omos began feuding with Riddle and Randy Orton, collectively known as RK-Bro. After weeks of confronting each other, a match was made between Styles and Omos and RK-Bro at SummerSlam on August 21 for the titles, where Styles and Omos lost the titles to RK-Bro, ending their reign at 133 days.

At Extreme Rules on September 26, Styles and Omos teamed with Bobby Lashley and lost to The New Day in a six-man tag team match. After this, it was announced that Styles and Omos would face RK-Bro in a rematch for the tag team titles at Crown Jewel. At the event on October 21, Styles and Omos once again lost to RK-Bro. At Survivor Series on November 21, Styles and Omos took part in a cross-brand battle royal, which Omos won. On the December 20 episode of Raw, after failing to win matches over the following weeks, Styles was attacked by Omos, ending their partnership and turning face for the first time since 2019.

The O.C. Reunion (2022–present) 
At Royal Rumble on January 29, 2022, Styles entered at number one and eliminated six wrestlers before being eliminated by Madcap Moss. Styles then challenged for the WWE Championship at Elimination Chamber on February 19, inside the namesake structure, where he failed to win the title after being eliminated by eventual winner Brock Lesnar. On the February 28 episode of Raw, Styles accepted an open challenge from Edge for a match at WrestleMania 38, which resulted in him being attacked by Edge afterwards. On the second night of the event on April 3, Styles lost to Edge following a distraction from Damian Priest. On the April 18 episode of Raw, Edge challenged Styles to a rematch at WrestleMania Backlash, which Styles accepted. At the event on May 8, Styles lost to Edge due to interference from Rhea Ripley. Styles then aligned himself with former Bullet Club stablemate Finn Bálor and Liv Morgan and challenged the newly formed faction called The Judgment Day, which consisted of Edge, Priest and Ripley to a six-person mixed tag team match at Hell In a Cell on June 5, which The Judgment Day won.

Styles failed to qualify for Money in the Bank after losing to Seth Rollins on the June 13 episode of Raw, and in a last chance battle royal on the June 27 episode of Raw. On the July 4 episode of Raw, he defeated The Miz and was attacked by him and Ciampa after the match, starting a feud between them. At SummerSlam on July 30, Styles distracted Miz by attacking Ciampa and causing him to lose his match against Logan Paul. On the August 1 episode of Raw, Styles defeated Miz and Mustafa Ali in a triple threat match but lost to Ciampa later that night, failing to earn an opportunity at the United States Championship. On the following episode of Raw, Styles defeated The Miz in a no disqualification match to end their feud. On the August 15 episode of Raw, he faced Bobby Lashley for the United States Championship in a losing effort. 

In the following weeks, Styles would rekindle his feud with The Judgment Day (which now included Bàlor and Dominik Mysterio), turning down numerous offers by Bàlor to join them. On the October 10 episode of Raw, Styles feigned joining The Judgment Day, leading to Luke Gallows and Karl Anderson returning to WWE to aid Styles in attacking them, reforming The O.C.. At Crown Jewel on November 5, The O.C. lost to The Judgment Day after interference from Ripley. Three weeks later at Survivor Series WarGames on November 26, Styles defeated Bálor. On the following episode of Raw, The O.C. were defeated by The Judgment Day in an eight-person mixed tag team match to end their feud.

On December 31, 2022, Styles announced that he had suffered a broken ankle during a house show three days prior, and would be out of action though the injury would not require surgery.

Reception and legacy 
In a 2016 article, Pro Wrestling Torch journalist Michael Moore noted that Styles "has long been regarded as one of the best wrestlers in the world". In November 2012, IGN UK columnist Matt Fowler ranked Styles at number 38 in his top 50 professional wrestlers of all-time list. Luke Winkie of Sports Illustrated listed him as the 46th greatest wrestler of all time in 2016, noting that: "Honestly, in a couple years it wouldn't surprise me if A.J. belongs in the top 20." 

Ayub Nouinou, a columnist for The Independent, described him as the "crown jewel" of TNA for more than a decade, before "applying his craft" for NJPW and ROH, among others. Nouinou went on to state that Styles had "established himself as one of the best talents on the planet over the last two years (2014 and 2015)" and noted that pertaining to Styles' 2016 WWE signing "the addition of Styles would have to be considered one of the greatest signings since the turn of the millennium". Finally, Nouinou made the prediction that "Styles can be the superstar that spearheads WWE into a new era". Josh Barnett, a columnist for USA Today, stated in March 2017 that Styles "could be considered the MVP of WWE over the last year". Barnett also added that in 2016 Styles had "some of the WWE's best matches, including multiple matches against John Cena and Roman Reigns", while also noting that he "is considered one of the rare performers who can have a great match with anyone". By late 2021, Philip Lindsey of Bleacher Report wrote that Styles was considered "one of the best in-ring competitors in the world. Many top stars have had some of their most memorable matches opposite this high-flying technician."

Many of Styles' peers have praised him as being one of the greatest in-ring performers. Kurt Angle named him as the best wrestler that he ever wrestled. Stone Cold Steve Austin dubbed Styles "the best wrestler on two feet", while The Undertaker, whom Styles faced in his retirement match, described him as "probably the best in the business... [the] closest to Shawn Michaels that there is." The comparison to Shawn Michaels was also made by renowned professional wrestling promoter and manager Paul Heyman, who stated that: "He's everything that Shawn Michaels, and Bret Hart, and Ric Flair were to their generation and he's updated it. He's evolved their styles to truly be the single most phenomenal in-ring performer I have ever had the honour and the pleasure of watching up close".

Other media 
In 2003, ROH released Evolution of a Phenom: The Best of AJ Styles, a DVD which covers Styles from his debut to mid-2003. In 2004, ROH released The Phenomenon Continues: The Best of AJ Styles Vol. 2, a follow-up DVD to the original released in 2003. Also in 2004, TNA released Phenomenal: The Best of A.J. Styles, a DVD covering Styles' best matches.

In 2006, ROH released a shoot interview featuring Styles, alongside Christopher Daniels for the promotions "Straight Shootin'" series. In 2007, TNA released Phenomenal: The Best of A.J. Styles Volume 2, a follow-up DVD to the original released in 2004. Also in 2007, Styles was mentioned in the Insane Clown Posse song "Scatterbrain" off their EP Eye of the Storm.

In 2008, Styles helped develop the first TNA wrestling video game known as TNA Impact!, which was released the same year on September 9. In 2009, Styles was featured on MTV's Made trying to help a young high schooler become a professional wrestler alongside Taylor Wilde and The Beautiful People (Angelina Love and Velvet Sky).

In 2011, Styles was featured in the music video for country singer Sarah Darling's song "Something to Do with Your Hands". In 2012, Styles and Montell Jordan presented the award for Best Rap/Hip Hop Record of the Year to Lecrae at the 43rd annual GMA Dove Awards.

In 2013, ROH released AJ Styles - Styles Clash, a 2-disc DVD featuring Styles' best ROH matches from 2002 to 2005.

In 2016, TNA released The Essential AJ Styles Collection, a 4-disc DVD set showcasing Styles' top 30 greatest TNA matches.

In 2018, it was announced that Styles would be on the cover for WWE 2K19. He selected the song "Survival" by Eminem to appear in the soundtrack.

Filmography

Television

Video games

Web

WWE Network

Personal life 
Jones has been married to school teacher Wendy since 2000. They have three sons: Ajay Covell Jones (born May 3, 2005), Avery Jones (born February 14, 2007), and Albey Jones (born September 15, 2009), and a daughter, Anney Jones (born October 8, 2014). Their first son's middle name was taken from the last name of Jones' best friend and fellow wrestler Christopher Daniels, whose real name is Daniel Covell. In 2010, Jones acquired a large tattoo down the right side of his torso which reads "AJ 05-03-05 02-14-07 09-15-09", representing his initials and birth dates of his first three children. In 2016, he added the birth date of his fourth child, reading "10-08-14". The family lives in Gainesville, Georgia.

Jones is a devout Christian, stating that in his life, "It's God first and family second." He is a big fan of Christian hip hop music, and his favorite groups to listen to are the West Coast-based K2S, Lil' Raskull, FTF, and L.G. Wise. While Jones was working for TNA, he met GRITS members Stacey "Coffee" Jones and Teron "Bonafide" Carter at Universal Studios Florida, TNA's former primary television taping location. Jones would become good friends with the duo, using their remix of his entrance music "I Am", later renamed "Get Ready to Fly").

Championships and accomplishments 

AAA
 Tag Team Tournament (2006) – with Low Ki and Samoa Joe
 All Access Wrestling
 AAW Heavyweight Championship (1 time)
 Ballpark Brawl
 Natural Heavyweight Championship (1 time) 
 The Baltimore Sun
 WWE Male Wrestler of the Year (2016)
 WWE Best In-Ring Moment (2016) – 
 Christian Wrestling Federation/Entertainment
 CWF/CWE Heavyweight Championship (1 time)
 Family Wrestling Entertainment
 FWE Heavyweight Championship (1 time)
 Independent Professional Wrestling (Florida)
 IPW Heavyweight Championship (4 times)
 Independent Wrestling Association Mid-South
 IWA Mid-South Heavyweight Championship (1 time)
 Ted Petty Invitational (2004)
 International Wrestling Cartel
 IWC Super Indies Championship (4 times)
 Super Indy Survivor Showdown Tournament (2004)
 Independent Wrestling Revolution
 IWR King of The Indies Championship (1 time)
 Maximum Pro Wrestling
 Max-Pro Television Championship (1 time)
 Midwest Pro Wrestling
 MPW Universal Heavyweight Championship (1 time)
 New Japan Pro-Wrestling
 IWGP Heavyweight Championship (2 times)
 New Korea Pro Wrestling Association
 NKPWA Junior Heavyweight Championship (1 time)
 NWA Wildside
 NWA Wildside Heavyweight Championship (1 time)
 NWA Wildside Television Championship (3 times)
 NWA: Total Nonstop Action / Total Nonstop Action Wrestling
 NWA World Heavyweight Championship (3 times)
 NWA World Tag Team Championship (4 times) – with Jerry Lynn (1), Abyss (1) and Christopher Daniels (2)
 TNA Legends/Global/Television Championship (2 times)
 TNA World Heavyweight Championship (2 times)
 TNA World Tag Team Championship (2 times) – with Tomko (1) and Kurt Angle (1)
 TNA X Division Championship (6 times)
 First TNA Triple Crown Champion (5 times)
 First TNA Grand Slam Champion (2 times)
 Bound For Glory Series (2013)
 TNA World Heavyweight Championship #1 Contenders Tournament (Second Bracket, 2009)
Gauntlet for the Gold (2007 – TNA World Tag Team Championship) – with Tomko
NWA World Tag Team Championship Tournament (2002) – with Jerry Lynn
TNA Year End Awards (10 times)
Feud of the Year (2005) vs. Christopher Daniels
Finisher of the Year (2003) 
Match of the Year (2006) 
Match of the Year (2009) vs. Sting at Bound for Glory on October 18, 2009
Mr. TNA (2003–2005)
Tag Team of the Year (2006) with Christopher Daniels
X Division Star of the Year (2004, 2005)
 Pennsylvania Premiere Wrestling 
 PPW Tag Team Championship (1 time) – with Tommy Suede
 Pro Wrestling Guerrilla
 PWG World Championship (1 time)
 Pro Wrestling Illustrated
 Match of the Year (2016) 
 Tag Team of the Year (2006) 
 Most Popular Wrestler (2017, 2018)
 Wrestler of the Year (2016–2018)
 Wrestler of the Decade (2010s)
 Ranked No. 1 of the 500 best singles wrestlers of the year in the PWI 500 in 2010
 Revolution Pro Wrestling
 RPW British Heavyweight Championship (1 time)
 Ring of Honor
 ROH Pure Championship (1 time)
 ROH World Tag Team Championship (1 time) – with Amazing Red
 ROH Pure Wrestling Championship Tournament (2004)
 Rolling Stone
 WWE Wrestler of the Year (2016)
 Sports Illustrated
 Ranked No. 4 of the top 10 men's wrestlers in 2018
 Ranked No.2 of the top 10 wrestlers in 2017
 World Wrestling All-Stars
 WWA International Cruiserweight Championship (1 time)
WWA International Cruiserweight Championship Tournament (2002)
 Wrestling Observer Newsletter
 Best Flying Wrestler (2005)
 Best Wrestling Maneuver (2003, 2015) Styles Clash
 Most Outstanding Wrestler (2014–2016)
 Pro Wrestling Match of the Year (2014) vs. Minoru Suzuki on August 1
 Wrestler of the Year (2015, 2016)
 United States/Canada MVP (2018)
 Worst Worked Match of the Year (2006) 
 Wrestling Observer Newsletter Hall of Fame (Class of 2017)
 WWE
 WWE Championship (2 times)
WWE Intercontinental Championship (1 time)
 WWE United States Championship (3 times)
WWE Raw Tag Team Championship (1 time) – with Omos
 32nd Triple Crown Champion
 15th Grand Slam Champion (under current format; 22nd overall)
WWE Intercontinental Championship Tournament (2020)
 Slammy Award (1 time)
 Match of the Year (2020)

Notes

References

External links 

 
 
 A.J. Styles' Impact Wrestling profile
 A.J. Styles' New Japan Pro-Wrestling profile 
 
 
 
 Stylesclash on Twitch

|-

|-

1977 births
American male professional wrestlers
Bullet Club members
Expatriate professional wrestlers in Japan
IWGP Heavyweight champions
Living people
NWA/WCW/WWE United States Heavyweight Champions
NWA World Heavyweight Champions
TNA World Heavyweight/Impact World Champions
TNA Legends/Global/Television/King of the Mountain Champions
TNA/Impact World Tag Team Champions
People from Camp Lejeune, North Carolina
People from Gainesville, Georgia
Professional wrestlers from North Carolina
ROH Pure Champions
Sportspeople from Georgia (U.S. state)
WWF/WWE Intercontinental Champions
WWE Champions
WWE Grand Slam champions
Professional wrestlers from Georgia (U.S. state)
Christians from North Carolina
Anderson Ravens and Lady Ravens athletes
College wrestlers in the United States
20th-century professional wrestlers
21st-century professional wrestlers
ROH World Tag Team Champions
TNA/Impact X Division Champions
PWG World Champions
NWA World Tag Team Champions
NWA Georgia Heavyweight Champions
Undisputed British Heavyweight Champions